The Count of Monte Cristo is a 1973 British-Italian animated television series directed by Maurice Brown.

Production details 
The series ran for one season, and was produced in the UK by British animation studio Halas and Batchelor Cartoon Films. John Halas and Joy Batchelor had been making animated films since the 1950s. The show was a co-production with RAI, and ITC. Tyne Tees Television purchased the studio and made a number of animated titles, including this. It was a UK-Italy co-production. The series had 17 episodes, but was not released on video or DVD. It aired in 1973 in the UK, and 1976 in Italy.

References

1976 Italian television series debuts
1973 British television series debuts
Television shows based on The Count of Monte Cristo